The sea-griffin (German: Fischgreif; Polish: rybogryf, gryf morski) is a heraldic charge, in form of a creature with the upper body of a griffin, which consists of the torso of a lion, the head, claws, and wings of an eagle, the ears of a horse, and the tail of a fish.

History 

The symbol originates from the region of Lands of Schlawe and Stolp in Pomerania, Central Europe. It was used in the coat of arms of the Swienca family, which hold powerful offices in the area from 13th to 14th centuries. Following them dying out in around 1316, the area went back under the direct rule of the House of Griffin, which continued to use the sea-griffin in the regional coat of arms.

The sea griffin was one of the nine charges present in the coat of arms of the Duchy of Pomerania, introduced around year 1530. It was a white (silver) sea griffin facing viewer's left, placed within a red field. It was meant to represent the island of Usedom, despite never used as its symbol before. It is also present in the coat of arms of the Puttkamer family, which, according to some historians, is related to Swienca family, although such statement remains debated.

Today, the sea griffin if used in various municipal coats of arms in Pomeranian and West Pomeranian Voivodeships in norther Poland. It include the cities of Darłowo, Łeba, Sianów, and Sławno, as well as the coat of arms of the counties of Sławno, and Tuchola, and the gminas (municipalities) of Gniewino, Potęgowo, Sławno, Trzebielino, and Tuchomie. It is also present in the coat of arms of commune of Trouville-la-Haule in Normandy, France.

Gallery

See also 
Griffin
Sea-lion
Siren (mythology)

References 

Heraldic beasts
Griffins
Fish in heraldry
Mythological creatures
Maritime folklore
Sea monsters
Mythological hybrids
German heraldry
Polish heraldry
History of Pomerania